The 2013–14 WHL season is the 48th season of the Western Hockey League (WHL). The regular season began on September 19, 2013 and ended on March 16, 2014. The playoffs began on March 27, 2014 following the regular season and ended on May 12, 2014, with the Edmonton Oil Kings winning the Ed Chynoweth Cup and a berth in the 2014 Memorial Cup.

Standings

Eastern Conference Tiebreaker

Red Deer Rebels vs. Prince Albert Raiders

Statistical leaders

Scoring leaders 

Players are listed by points, then goals.

Note: GP = Games played; G = Goals; A = Assists; Pts. = Points; PIM = Penalty minutes

Goaltenders 

These are the goaltenders that lead the league in GAA that have played at least 1440 minutes.

Note: GP = Games played; Mins = Minutes played; W = Wins; L = Losses; OTL = Overtime losses; SOL = Shootout losses; SO = Shutouts; GAA = Goals against average; Sv% = Save percentage

2014 WHL Playoffs

Conference Quarter-finals

Eastern Conference

(1) Edmonton Oil Kings vs. (8) Prince Albert Raiders

(2) Regina Pats vs. (7) Brandon Wheat Kings

(3) Calgary Hitmen vs. (6) Kootenay Ice

(4) Medicine Hat Tigers vs (5) Swift Current Broncos

Western Conference

(1) Kelowna Rockets vs. (8) Tri-City Americans

(2) Portland Winterhawks vs. (7) Vancouver Giants

(3) Victoria Royals vs. (6) Spokane Chiefs

(4) Seattle Thunderbirds vs. (5) Everett Silvertips

Conference Semi-finals

Eastern Conference

(1) Edmonton Oil Kings vs. (7) Brandon Wheat Kings

(4) Medicine Hat Tigers vs. (6) Kootenay Ice

Western Conference

(1) Kelowna Rockets vs. (4) Seattle Thunderbirds

(2) Portland Winterhawks vs. (3) Victoria Royals

Conference Finals

Eastern Conference

(1) Edmonton Oil Kings vs. (4) Medicine Hat Tigers

Western Conference

(1) Kelowna Rockets vs. (2) Portland Winterhawks

WHL Championship

(W2) Portland Winterhawks vs. (E1) Edmonton Oil Kings

Playoff scoring leaders
Note: GP = Games played; G = Goals; A = Assists; Pts = Points; PIM = Penalty minutes

Playoff leading goaltenders
Note: GP = Games played; Mins = Minutes played; W = Wins; L = Losses; GA = Goals Allowed; SO = Shutouts; SV& = Save percentage; GAA = Goals against average

WHL awards

All-Star Teams

Eastern Conference

Western Conference

See also 
 2014 Memorial Cup
 List of WHL seasons
 2013–14 OHL season
 2013–14 QMJHL season
 2014 in ice hockey
 2013 in ice hockey

References

External links 

 Official website of the Western Hockey League
 Official website of the Canadian Hockey League
 Official website of the MasterCard Memorial Cup
 Official website of the Subway Super Series

Western Hockey League seasons
Whl
WHL